Goodenia larapinta  is a species of flowering plant in the family Goodeniaceae and is endemic to the Northern Territory. It is an erect perennial herb with elliptic to lance-shaped stem-leaves and racemes of yellow flowers.

Description

Taxonomy and naming
Goodenia larapinta was first formally described in 1896 by Ralph Tate in the Report on the work of the Horn Scientific Expedition to Central Australia. In 1990, Roger Charles Carolin selected specimens collected by Tate near Glen Edith in June 1894 as the lectotype.

Distribution and habitat
This goodenia grows in rocky places in the Northern Territory, south from the Barkly Tableland.

Conservation status
Goodenia larapinta is classified as "least concern" under the Northern Territory Government Territory Parks and Wildlife Conservation Act 1976.

References

larapinta
Flora of the Northern Territory
Plants described in 1896
Taxa named by Ralph Tate